{{Infobox gymnast
|name = Daria Atamanov
|image = Daria Atamanov Clubs ECh 2022.jpg
|imagesize = 
|caption = 
|fullname = 
|altname = 
|nickname = 
|country = 
|formercountry = 
|birth_date = 
|birth_place = Tel Aviv, Israel
|hometown = Rishon LeZion, Israel
|residence = Tel Aviv, Israel
|height = 
|discipline = Rhythmic gymnastics
|level = Senior International Elite
|natlteam = 2020-present
|club= Hapoel Rishon LeZion
|gym= 
|collegeteam=
|headcoach = Ayelet Zussman
Raya Irgo
|assistcoach = Linoy Ashram Ida Mayrin
|choreographer =  Ayelet Zussman
|music = 
|eponymousskills=
|retired=
|worldranking= 
|show-medals = yes
|medaltemplates= 

{{MedalCount
 | FIG World Cup | 4|4|1
 | FIG World Challenge Cup | 1|2|1
 | European Championships | 1|3|1
 | Junior European Championships | 1|2|1
| World Games | 2|1|0
|Total|9|12|''4}}

}}Daria Atamanov''' (born December 6, 2005) is an Israeli individual rhythmic gymnast. She is the 2022 European All-Around Champion, Silver medallist in Hoop, Clubs, Ribbon, and Team Bronze medallist. During her junior career, she was the 2020 Junior European Champion with Clubs, Silver medallist with Rope, and Bronze medallist with Ribbon; she has also captured the highest All-Around Junior score there. On national level, she is the 2022 Israeli National All-around champion and a two-time (2019, 2020) Israeli Junior National All-Around champion.

Career

Senior
In the 2022 season, Atamanov debuted as a senior competing at the 2022 World Cup Athens. She won a silver medal in the All-Around, behind Italian Sofia Raffaeli and in the Individual Finals Event, she won two gold medals with Hoop and Ribbon and two silver medals with Ball and Clubs. She then compete at the 2022 World Cup Baku, where she was 4th place in the All-around final and in the Individual Finals Event, she won a gold medal with Clubs and silver with Ribbon.

At the 2022 European Championship, 
On June 18th, Atamanov became the European All-Around Champion, becoming the second Israeli gymnast after Linoy Ashram to complete the feat. 

On the same day, she had also won a Bronze medal in the team final along with teammate Adi Asya Katz and the Israeli Senior Group.
The next day, Atamanov has won the silver medal in each of these apparatuses: Hoop, Clubs, and Ribbon.

In July 2022 at the 2022 World Games in Birmingham Daria won the gold medal in Ball and Ribbon, the silver medal in Clubs and became the first ever Israeli athlete who won gold at World Games.

In August 2022 Atamanov competed at the world challenge cup in Cluj Napoca, Where she won the bronze medal in the AA competition, Gold with the ball and silver with the clubs and the ribbon

Routine music information

References

External links 

 
 

Living people
2005 births
Israeli rhythmic gymnasts
Sportspeople from Tel Aviv
Jewish sportspeople
Competitors at the 2022 World Games
World Games gold medalists
21st-century Israeli women
Medalists at the Rhythmic Gymnastics European Championships
World Games silver medalists